William "Sonny" Criss (23 October 1927 – 19 November 1977) was an American jazz musician.

An alto saxophonist of prominence during the bebop era of jazz, he was one of many players influenced by Charlie Parker.

Biography
William Criss was born in Memphis, Tennessee, United States, and moved to Los Angeles at the age of 15. He then went on to play in various bands including Howard McGhee's, which also featured Charlie Parker.

Criss had developed his own, concise, bluesy tone by this point, and though his basic style did not vary much, his ability on the instrument continued to develop. Nevertheless, he continued to drift from band to band, and played on some records with Johnny Otis and Billy Eckstine.

His first major break came in 1947, on a number of jam sessions arranged by jazz impresario Norman Granz. In 1956 he signed to Imperial Records, based in New York, and recorded a series albums including Jazz U.S.A , Go Man! and Sonny Criss Plays Cole Porter featuring pianist Sonny Clark. Capitol, which owned the master recordings, reissued them as a double-CD set on their Blue Note imprint in 2000. Criss also recorded At the Crossroads with pianist Wynton Kelly.

Prestige signed Criss in 1965, and he continued to record well-acclaimed albums which were mainly rooted in hard bop traditions. Sonny's Dream featured arrangements by Horace Tapscott. Later sessions were recorded for Muse and Impulse.

By 1977, Criss had developed stomach cancer and did not play again. As a consequence of this painful condition, Criss committed suicide (self-inflicted gunshot) in 1977, in his adopted city of Los Angeles. He never married, but had one son, Steven Criss.

Discography

As leader
 California Boppin'  (Fresh Sound, 1947)
 Intermission Riff (Pablo, 1951 [1988])
 Jazz USA (Imperial, 1956)
 Go Man! (Imperial, 1956)
 Sonny Criss Plays Cole Porter (Imperial, 1956)
 Sonny Criss at the Crossroads (Peacock, 1959) on CD as Featuring Wynton Kelly
 Criss Cross (Imperial, 1963) compilation
 Mr. Blues Pour Flirter (Brunswick [France] Records, 1963)
 This Is Criss! (Prestige, 1966)
 Portrait of Sonny Criss (Prestige, 1967)
 Up, Up And Away (Prestige, 1967)
 The Beat Goes On! (Prestige, 1968)
 Sonny's Dream (Birth of the New Cool) (Prestige, 1968)
 Rockin' in Rhythm (Prestige, 1968)
 I'll Catch the Sun! (Prestige, 1969)
 The Best Of Sonny Criss: Hits of the '60's (Prestige, 1970) compilation 
 Live in Italy (Fresh Sound, 1974)
 Saturday Morning (Xanadu, 1975)
 Crisscraft (Muse, 1975)
Out of Nowhere (Muse, 1976)
 Warm & Sonny (Impulse!, 1976)
 The Joy of Sax (Impulse!, 1977)
 The Sonny Criss Memorial Album (Xanadu, 1984)

As sideman
With Dexter Gordon
The Hunt (Savoy, 1947) also on Jazz Concert West Coast vols 1-3 (Savoy)
With Wardell Gray All Stars
 Wardell Gray Memorial, Vol. 2 (Prestige, 1950)
With Charlie Parker and Chet Baker
 Inglewood Jam (Fresh Sound, 1952)
With Buddy Rich
The Wailing Buddy Rich (Norgran, 1955)
 The Swinging Buddy Rich (Norgran, 1955)
 The Cinch - quintet Live at Birdland - (1958)
With Lou Rawls and Onzy Matthews Big Band
 Tobacco Road (Capitol, 1963)
With Onzy Matthews
 Sounds For The '60's (Capitol, 1966)
With Esther Phillips and Onzy Matthews Orchestra
 Confessin' The Blues (Atlantic, 1966)
With Hampton Hawes All Stars
 Live At Memory Lane (Fresh Sound, 1970)

References

External links
Sonny Criss at the Hard Bop Home Page
Sonny Criss discography at Jazz Discography Project

1927 births
1977 deaths
1977 suicides
African-American saxophonists
American jazz alto saxophonists
American male saxophonists
Bebop saxophonists
Hard bop saxophonists
Suicides by firearm in California
Musicians from Memphis, Tennessee
Xanadu Records artists
Prestige Records artists
Imperial Records artists
Savoy Records artists
Muse Records artists
20th-century American saxophonists
Jazz musicians from Tennessee
20th-century American male musicians
American male jazz musicians
20th-century African-American musicians